Grey High School is a semi-private English-speaking high school (grades 8 - 12) for boys situated in the suburb of Mill Park in Port Elizabeth in the Eastern Cape province of South Africa. It is one of the top sporting schools in the country, with consistently strong academics, and is one of the oldest schools in South Africa.

History

The school was founded as The Grey Institute by John Paterson, who also founded Standard Bank and The Herald newspaper, and named after Sir George Grey, Governor of the Cape Colony for the period 5 December 1854 – 15 August 1861, who was the benefactor for the original school to be constructed adjacent to the Donkin Reserve in Central, Port Elizabeth. The foundation stone was laid on 4 June 1856 and The Grey Institute officially opened for classes in 1859.

Sir George Grey, during his times as governor in South Africa, Australia and New Zealand is also affiliated with the establishment of other educational institutions such as Grey College in Bloemfontein, Auckland Grammar School in Auckland, New Zealand, and Whanganui Collegiate School, in Whanganui, New Zealand.

Due to significant growth from the "twice one hundred boys" referenced in "The Grey" school song written as the poem "The School on the Hill" by Rector William Chubb Meredith, the school relocated to College Drive, Mill Park in 1915.

In 1930, Grey Junior School separated from the high school into newly constructed buildings to the south east of the high school on the same campus and references to "The Grey Institute" were dropped in favour of "Grey High School" and "Grey Junior School".

While "The Grey" school song now references "half a thousand boys", there are in fact approximately 870 boys in the school.

The school motto of "Tria Juncta in Uno", Latin for "Three Joined in One" is derived from the Most Honourable Order of the Bath of which Sir George Grey was a Knight Commander. (Three past South African presidents have been made Honorary Knights of Order of the Bath.) While the motto likely originally referred to the Holy Trinity, it has been reinterpreted to refer to the body, mind and spirit that make up a scholar at Grey.

Traditions 
Quad Races:
Inspired by the film Chariots of Fire, which deals with the rivalry between two famous Olympic athletes, Grey High School had both the cloisters and the necessary clock tower to perform this, and thus created its own version of a "Quad Race", held annually.

Matric students (final-year students) participate in time trials and the two most athletic qualifiers are chosen to compete in the race. They then toss for position, the winner usually choosing the inside lane. They wait for the four quarters to strike on the clock tower before they are set off by the Rector on the first strike of the chimes. They begin the race directly in front of the war memorial and they run in an anti-clockwise direction. They race against each other as well as against the ten chimes which take approximately 20 seconds to ring. The record of 1991 stands to the name of past scholar and staff member, Greg Miller, with a time of 19.8 seconds. He is one of less than a handful who have beaten the clock.

Robert Selley Memorial Concert:
The Selley Concerts were inaugurated in 1986 in conjunction with the Founder's Day celebrations. The Selley Concerts recognises the contributions Robert Selley made to the school's music department. The event is hosted annually in the Feathermarket Centre, on the second Wednesday evening in May.

The concert typically comprises The Grey Junior School Concert Band, and from the high school, The Grey Voices (choir) The Grey String Orchestra and The Grey Orchestra. A Jazz Band of senior high school musicians also regularly performs. The Old Grey Band is included in the program every second year, and consists of Old Greys of any age with musical experience who wish to be part of the show.

Trooping the Colour:
Ceremony performed by senior members of the Cadet Detachment, mostly matrics. First performed in 1938, this includes cadets from grade 10 to 12 parading to a marching band with local South African military officials in attendance.

Reunion Week:
The old boys' union arranges a series of events and functions in the second week of May annually. This is particurly well attended by Old Greys and the events include a golf day, reunion dinner, Selley memorial concert, Trooping the Colour, Old Grey Club nights, and a weekend sports derby against a traditional rival school.

Remembrance Day: Held on the 11th of November annually and open to members of the public who lost family in the First or Second World Wars, and attended by World War veterans and local senior military personnel. The Last Post is played by the lead trumpeter and there is an opportunity to lay wreaths at the war memorial in the Memorial Quad with a fly past of vintage military aircraft (typically including a Harvard T-6) courtesy of the Davidson family.

Sports
Grey High School has long-standing annual derby days for both summer and winter sports with traditional rivals such as Dale College, Queens College, Grey College, Muir College, St Andrews College, and Selborne College that stretch back to at least the 1960s, and have more recently establish annual derbies with Paul Roos Gymnasium and Wynberg Boys' High.

The school offers a number of major sports including rugby, hockey, athletics, cricket, rowing, swimming, water polo, tennis, squash, air-rifle shooting, golf, basketball, mountain biking and cross-country with several provincial and national representatives at age-group level over the years, and many provincial and national representatives at senior levels of international competition.

Grey High School has a long history of producing cricketers of international standard and rivals King Edward School in Johannesburg, and Bishops College, for second place after Durban High School for the most South African representatives at senior level, and has outright produced the most South African Schools cricketers of any school.

The Pollock Oval is the main cricket oval in front of the school, named in 1987 for alumnus Graeme Pollock, voted South Africa's Cricketer of the 20th Century.

The Kolisi Field is the main rugby field at the back of the school, renamed during the annual reunion week in May 2022, for alumnus Siya Kolisi, Captain of the Springboks during their victorious 2019 Rugby World Cup campaign.

The Grey Rugby Festival is hosted annually by the school and includes under-19 and age-group teams from various schools from around South Africa.

The Hibbert Shield hockey tournament has recently been established and hosts schools from all areas of South Africa. This shield was named for a family of alumni of the school who have been extensively involved in hockey for several decades as staff, coaches and national representatives in the sport.

Grey is the only school in Port Elizabeth to offer sweep-oar rowing as a sport. This sees the rowing crews travel to East London, Knysna, Port Alfred and Pretoria to compete in regattas with other rowing schools from around the country, with the culmination of the season being the South African Schools Championships in Pretoria. In 2014, two U16 boys were selected to represent South African Schools Rowing in Belgium and returned with gold and silver medals.

The Hirsch Shield is an athletics meeting at which Grey High School competes annually with schools including Kingswood College, Queens College, Dale College, Graeme College, Muir College, St Andrews College, and Selborne College. Inaugurated in 1917, the competition for this prestigious shield is the oldest schools athletics event in South Africa.

In 2020, SA School Sports magazine named Grey High School as the "Top Boys Sports School of the Decade" taking into account performances from across the sport codes of rugby, cricket, water polo and hockey. Alumnus Greg Miller holds the distinction of being one of 11 boys in South African history to obtain South African Schools colours for both cricket and rugby, going on to play both cricket and rugby at senior provincial level.

Notable alumni

Sports

Cricket 

 Graeme Pollock, former South African cricketer
 Peter Pollock, former South African cricketer
 David Callaghan, South African cricketer
 Wayne Parnell, South African cricketer, Warriors cricket player and South African U19 Cricket Captain
 Johan Botha, South African cricketer
 Atholl Henry McKinnon, South African cricketer
 David Nosworthy, South African cricketer and coach of the Nashua Titans, Highveld Lions and Canterbury Wizards
 Pieter Strydom, South African cricketer
 Rusty Theron, South African and USA international cricketer
 Ian Howell, International cricket umpire
 Lutho Sipamla, South African cricketer
 Tristan Stubbs, South African cricketer
 Matthew Breetzke, South African cricketer
 Robert Dower, South African cricketer
 Dante Parkin, South African cricketer
 Billy Brann, South African cricketer
 Geoff Chubb, South African cricketer
 Aubrey Faulkner, South African cricketer
 Ron Draper, South African cricketer
 Rupert Hanley, South African cricketer

Rugby 
 Siya Kolisi, Cell C Sharks and Springbok rugby captain
 Jeremy Ward, South Africa Under-20, Sharks and Stade Français rugby player
 Tim Whitehead, former Natal Sharks, Western Province, and  rugby player
 Curwin Bosch, Springbok, South Africa Under-20 and Sharks rugby player
 Luke Watson, Springbok rugby player, former Western Province, Stormers and  captain
 Mike Catt, former England and British Lions rugby player, former assistant coach for England and Italy, and current assistant coach for Ireland
 Roy Dryburgh, Springbok rugby player and captain
 JJ Engelbrecht, Vodacom Blue Bulls and Springbok rugby player
 Jan Serfontein, Bulls and Springbok rugby player
 Steven Hunt, South African Rugby 7s player
 Sergeal Petersen, South Africa Under-20 and Free State Cheetahs rugby player
 Junior Pokomela, South Africa Under-20, Free State Cheetahs and Stormers rugby player
 Rory Duncan, former Free State Cheetahs rugby player and captain, former Currie Cup head coach, and coach of DoCoMo Red Hurricanes Osaka in Japan
 Michael van Vuuren, Bath Rugby, Leicester Tigers and former South Africa Under-20 rugby player
 Keanu Vers, South African schools national rugby team, South Africa under-20 and Eastern Province Kings player
 Gavin Cowley, former Junior Springbok, Eastern Province rugby player and captain, rugby commentator for SuperSport television
 Alan Solomons, former Springbok assistant coach to Nick Mallett, head coach at various teams in South Africa and the UK most notably, The Stormers, Ulster, The Barbarians, Edinburgh, and Director of Rugby at Worcester Warriors

Hockey 
 Wayne Graham, South Africa hockey player, 1996 Olympic games
 Kevin Chree, South Africa hockey player, 1996 Olympic games
 Chris Hibbert, South Africa hockey player, 2004 Summer Olympics and the 2008 Summer Olympics
 Clyde Abrahams, South Africa hockey player, 2008 Summer Olympics
 Dr Ian Symons, South Africa hockey player, 2004 Summer Olympics and the 2008 Summer Olympics
 Lindsay Reid-Ross, South Africa hockey player
 Russell Fensham, South Africa hockey player
 Wayne Fensham, South Africa hockey player
 Paul Blake, South Africa hockey player, 2008 Summer Olympics

Tennis 
 Cliff Drysdale, 1972 US Open Tennis doubles champion as well as a number of other singles and doubles championships; represented South Africa in the Davis Cup

Swimming 
 Kevin Paul  gold medalist at the 2008 Summer Paralympics for men's 100m breaststroke SB9, breaking the world record at 17 years of age
 Peter Williams South African former Olympic and Commonwealth Games swimmer who set a world record in the 50-metre freestyle
 Christopher Reid, South African swimmer, 2016 Summer Olympics

Water Polo 

 Jason Evezard, South Africa Water Polo, 2020 Summer Olympics

Military 
 Rear Admiral (JG) Derek Christian, Commandant of the South African Military Academy
 Rear Admiral Robert Higgs, Flag Officer Fleet, South African Navy

Politics 
 David Maynier, South African parliamentarian, shadow minister of defence

Science 
 Vivian Frederick Maynard FitzSimons, leading herpetologist and Director of the Transvaal Museum

Arts and culture 
 Barry Smith, Organist Emeritus, St George's Cathedral, Cape Town; former associate professor, Faculty of Music, UCT
 David Fanning, executive producer of the multiple award-winning Frontline, the longest running documentary investigative show in the United States
 Eric Lloyd Williams, journalist and war correspondent 
 Brandon Lorenzo, television presenter and reality TV show star on multiple shows including MTV Base and The Wendy Williams Show.

In the media
 The school was featured in the second episode of the Australian Seven Network's version of the TV show The World's Strictest Parents.
 The Grey Cycle Tour 2008 was a cycle around the country of South Africa completed by seven students from Grey High School. All the funds raised went to the Childhood Cancer Foundation South Africa (CHOC).  The idea of the Grey Cycle Tour was to include young people in the fight against cancer. The total distance traveled was 2300 km. In total, R580,000 was raised.

References

External links
Top 20 Schools in Africa
Official website

Boys' schools in South Africa
Boarding schools in South Africa
Schools in the Eastern Cape
Educational institutions established in 1856
1856 establishments in Africa
1856 establishments in the British Empire
Buildings and structures in Port Elizabeth